Graben (Lechfeld) Gewerbepark station is a railway station in the municipality of Graben, in Bavaria, Germany. It is located on the Bobingen–Landsberg am Lech line of Deutsche Bahn. The station opened on 21 October 2012.

Services
 the following services stop at Graben (Lechfeld) Gewerbepark:

References

External links
 
 Graben (Lechfeld) Gewerbepark layout 
 

Railway stations in Bavaria
Buildings and structures in Augsburg (district)
Railway stations in Germany opened in 2012